The Ogden Utah Temple (formerly the Ogden Temple) is the sixteenth constructed and fourteenth operating temple of the Church of Jesus Christ of Latter-day Saints. Located in Ogden, Utah, it was originally built with a modern, single-spire design very similar to the Provo Utah Temple. During a renovation completed in 2014, the exterior and interior were extensively changed.

History
The temples in Ogden and Provo were planned due to overcrowding in the Salt Lake, Manti, and Logan temples. The Ogden Temple serves more than 135,000 members. The intention to construct a temple in Ogden was announced by the church on August 24, 1967. On September 7, 1970, a cornerstone-laying ceremony was held. The site for the temple was a  lot called Tabernacle Square that the church had owned since the area was settled. In 1921, church president Heber J. Grant inspected the site as a possible temple site, but decided the time was not right to build.

At the time of construction, the Ogden Temple differed from temples built previously by the church. The original design was very contemporary and the lot chosen was in downtown Ogden, surrounded by businesses and offices. The temple in Ogden was the first built in Utah since the Salt Lake Temple was dedicated in 1893 and since Utah gained statehood in 1896.

The temple included six ordinance rooms and eleven sealing rooms. The stone on the temple was fluted and decorative metal grillwork was added between the stone. Gold windows with directional glass also added to the beauty of the temple.

The Ogden Temple was dedicated on January 18, 1972, by church president Joseph Fielding Smith, a few weeks before the Provo Temple was dedicated.

In 2020, like all the church's other temples, the Ogden Utah Temple was closed in response to the coronavirus pandemic.

Renovations

Beginning in 2001 and lasting through much of 2002, both the exterior of the temple and the surrounding grounds underwent significant changes. Weather damage to the exterior of the temple was repaired and the spire, which was originally a yellowish-gold, was painted bright white. A fiberglass statue of the Angel Moroni covered in gold leaf was added to the temple's spire, almost 30 years after the temple was dedicated. The temple grounds received walkways and paths allowing visitors to walk around the temple as well as to access the structure from the main adjacent street.

On February 17, 2010, the church announced that the Ogden Temple would undergo major exterior and interior renovations that would significantly modify the look of the building. The upgrades included replacing old electrical, heating, and plumbing systems with more modern, energy-saving equipment. Additional improvements included construction of a new underground parking structure, complete relandscaping of the temple block, and renovation of the adjacent Ogden Tabernacle, including removal of its spire. The interior was reduced from 131,000 to 115,000 sq ft, but through an improved design, there is more usable space following the reconstruction.

On April 25, 2014, the church announced that with renovations nearing completion, a public open house would be held from August 1 to September 6, 2014. The temple was then rededicated in three sessions on September 21, 2014, by church president Thomas S. Monson.

Other structures
There are a number of other significant buildings located on the same block as the temple. The first building constructed was the Weber Stake Tabernacle (1855) on the southeast corner of the block. It was demolished in 1971 in conjunction with the construction of the temple. 

The Weber Stake Relief Society Building, completed in 1902, was located on the western portion of the block. It was deeded to the Weber County Daughters of the Utah Pioneers in 1926, who used it as a pioneer museum. In January 2012 it was moved approximately one block west to a lot donated by the City of Ogden. The move was to accommodate a new parking structure built as a part of the temple remodel.

The Miles Goodyear Cabin was located adjacent to the Weber Stake Relief Society Building as part of the pioneer museum from 1928 to late 2011, when it was moved to the new pioneer museum location.

The largest of the other structures to occupy the lot is the Ogden Tabernacle, constructed in 1956. The large tower on the north side of the building was removed in the 2010–14 renovation.

See also

 The Church of Jesus Christ of Latter-day Saints in Utah
 Comparison of temples of The Church of Jesus Christ of Latter-day Saints
 List of temples of The Church of Jesus Christ of Latter-day Saints
 List of temples of The Church of Jesus Christ of Latter-day Saints by geographic region
 Temple architecture (Latter-day Saints)

References

External links
 
 Ogden Utah Temple Official site
 Ogden Utah Temple at ChurchofJesusChristTemples.org

20th-century Latter Day Saint temples
Buildings and structures in Ogden, Utah
Religious buildings and structures completed in 1972
Temples (LDS Church) in Utah
Tourist attractions in Ogden, Utah
1972 establishments in Utah